Võ Thị Thắng (10 December 1945 – 22 August 2014) was a Vietnamese revolutionary and stateswoman. She served as a member of the Long An delegation to the National Assembly of Vietnam during its fourth, fifth, and sixth sessions. She also served as a member of the Central Committee of the Communist Party of Vietnam (eighth and ninth congresses), the Director General of the Vietnam National Administration of Tourism, the Chairwoman of the Vietnam–Cuba Friendship Association, and the Vice President of the Vietnam Women's Union.

Outside of Vietnam, she is most well known for a photograph of her smiling at her sentencing for an attempted assassination during the Vietnam War. The photograph is popularly known as the "Smile of Victory" and has become a symbol of Vietnamese women who fought in the war.

Early life 
Võ Thị Thắng was born on 10 December 1945 in what is now Tân Bửu Commune, Bến Lức District, Long An Province, Vietnam. She was the youngest of eight siblings, and her family members were supporters of the North Vietnamese government. At the age of 16 she joined the underground National Liberation Front of South Vietnam (NLF). When she was 17, she moved to Saigon (present-day Ho Chi Minh City) and joined the local branches of the Ho Chi Minh Communist Youth Union and Vietnamese Students' Association, both of which were banned by the South Vietnamese government.

Vietnam War 
In July 1968, during the Tet Offensive of the Vietnam War, the NLF tasked her with assassinating a suspected spy in Saigon. After failing to kill her target, she was arrested by the South Vietnamese authorities and sentenced by a military court to 20 years of hard labour in Côn Đảo Prison. Upon receiving her sentence, she faced the jury and retorted, "Will your government last long enough to imprison me for 20 years?" A photograph of her smiling, taken by a Japanese reporter at her sentencing, became popularly known as the "Smile of Victory", a symbol of Vietnamese women who fought in the Vietnam War.

She was released on 7 March 1974 under the Paris Peace Accords, having served less than six years of her sentence.

Later life 
After the end of the Vietnam War and the reunification of Vietnam on 30 April 1975, she retired from the People's Army of Vietnam and continued her work with the Ho Chi Minh Communist Youth Union. The Vietnamese government later appointed her standing vice president of the Vietnam Women's Union.

She was elected to the fourth (1971–1975), fifth (1975–1976), and sixth (1976–1981) sessions of the National Assembly of Vietnam as a representative of Long An Province, as well as to the eighth and ninth congresses of the Central Committee of the Communist Party of Vietnam. She also served as the Director General of the Vietnam National Administration of Tourism and the Chairwoman of the Vietnam–Cuba Friendship Association.

She retired in 2007 and died on 22 August 2014.

Honours 
She was posthumously conferred the title Hero of the People's Armed Forces by Vietnamese president Trương Tấn Sang on 20 August 2015. The Ministry of Culture, Sports and Tourism held the award ceremony on 10 September 2015, at the Caravelle Hotel in Ho Chi Minh City.

A primary school in Havana, Cuba, is named after her.

Awards

See also 
 Nguyễn Văn Trỗi, who was captured and executed after a failed attempt to assassinate two prominent U.S. officials in 1964
 Võ Thị Sáu, who was captured and executed after a failed grenade attack against colonial collaborators in 1952

Notes

References  

1945 births
2014 deaths
Members of the National Assembly (Vietnam)
Viet Cong
Members of the 8th Central Committee of the Communist Party of Vietnam
Members of the 9th Central Committee of the Communist Party of Vietnam
20th-century Vietnamese women politicians
20th-century Vietnamese politicians
Women in the Vietnam War
Female wartime spies
Hero of the People's Armed Forces